Lyn Richards (born 1944) is an Australian social scientist and writer who, with computer scientist Tom Richards, developed the software analysis packages NUD*IST and NVivo.

Early life and education 
Richards studied political science and sociology at La Trobe University. Her early research considered the involvement of migrants in the Democratic Labor Party.

Research and career 
Richards was appointed to the faculty at La Trobe University, where she worked on family sociology. She looked at the relationships between family life and home ownership in Australia. She identified that as families aspired to suburban living, they spent less times in the homes they worked so hard to finance.

Richards became aware that her academic research needed more sophisticated data analysis tools, and started to work with Tom Richards on the development of quantitative analysis software. She left La Trobe University and launched QSR International, a software development company.

At QSR International, Richards created the software packages NUD*IST and NVivo.

Selected publications

Personal life 
Richards is married to computer scientist Tom Richards.

References 

1944 births
Living people
Australian statisticians
Australian women academics
La Trobe University alumni
Academic staff of La Trobe University